The Badger Showdown was a college Division I men's ice hockey tournament usually played before New Years at first the Bradley Center in Milwaukee, Wisconsin and then the Kohl Center in Madison. Wisconsin served as the tournament's host for the entirety of its run. The tournament was first held in 1989 and was played during the final week of December every year but twice: in 2005 and 2010. Wisconsin competed in the tournament every year and won more than half of the total championships (11 out of 21).

The tournament was conceived by Jeff Sauer and Joel Maturi and was initially a huge success, drawing over 30,000 fans for its first iteration. By the 21st century, however, its audience had dwindled to less than half that number and its main sponsor dropped the showcase in 2002. A move to the Badger's home venue in 2003 kept the tournament alive for several more years but it was ultimately cancelled as a cost-cutting measure, with the final championship held in January 2010.

The tournament champion received the Pettit Cup, named in honor of Lloyd and Jane Bradley Pettit.

Yearly results

Team records

References

College ice hockey tournaments in the United States
College sports tournaments in Wisconsin
Wisconsin Badgers ice hockey
Ice hockey competitions in Wisconsin
1989 establishments in Wisconsin
2010 disestablishments in Wisconsin
Recurring sporting events established in 1989
Recurring sporting events disestablished in 2010